Julio Argentino Pascual Roca Funes (17 May 1873 – 8 October 1942) was an Argentine politician and diplomat.

He was born to Clara Funes and General Julio Roca, who would become President of Argentina and dominate national politics for a generation after 1880. Earning a law degree at the University of Buenos Aires in 1895, he served in the Argentine Chamber of Deputies for Córdoba Province from 1904 to 1916, and in the Argentine Senate from 1916 to 1922. He was then elected Governor of Córdoba, serving from 1922 to 1925. The 1931 general elections made him Vice President of Argentina, serving from 1932 to 1938 with President Agustín Justo.

His tenure as Vice President was remembered mainly for his being the co-author of the Roca-Runciman Treaty, signed with Great Britain in February 1933 in order to strengthen the commercial and financial ties between the two countries. Justo's successor, Roberto María Ortiz, appointed Roca Ambassador to Brazil in 1938, and he was named Minister of Foreign Relations in 1940. He retired the following year, and died in Buenos Aires in 1942.

References

1873 births
1942 deaths
People from Córdoba, Argentina
Argentine people of Spanish descent
University of Buenos Aires alumni
20th-century Argentine lawyers
Members of the Argentine Chamber of Deputies elected in Córdoba
Members of the Argentine Senate for Córdoba
Governors of Córdoba Province, Argentina
Vice presidents of Argentina
Foreign ministers of Argentina
Ambassadors of Argentina to Brazil
People of the Infamous Decade
Argentine anti-communists
Burials at La Recoleta Cemetery
Politicians from Córdoba, Argentina
Children of presidents of Argentina